Nikolay Nikolayevich Solovyov (12 July 1931 – 15 November 2007) was a flyweight Greco-Roman wrestler from Russia who won a gold medal at the 1956 Olympics.

Solovyov first competed in shooting and fencing, placing sixth in the Soviet foil championships. He then changed to wrestling and won the Soviet title in 1955 and 1959, placing second in 1958 and third in 1954. He graduated from an institute of physical education, and after retiring from competitions trained the Soviet wrestling team. He also served as an international referee and as vice-president of the Saint Petersburg wrestling federation.

References

1931 births
2007 deaths
Soviet male sport wrestlers
Olympic wrestlers of the Soviet Union
Wrestlers at the 1956 Summer Olympics
Russian male sport wrestlers
Olympic gold medalists for the Soviet Union
Olympic medalists in wrestling
Medalists at the 1956 Summer Olympics
Burials at Bogoslovskoe Cemetery